KONZ (105.1 FM) was a non-commercial radio station licensed to Weatherford, Oklahoma, broadcasting a classic hits music format, consisting of pop hits of the 1960s through the 1980s. The station received its broadcast license on August 12, 2014, and was owned by the Better Public Broadcasting Association. The association surrendered the licenses for its stations, including KONZ, on September 11, 2018, and the Federal Communications Commission cancelled the licenses on September 14.

References

External links

Defunct radio stations in the United States
ONZ
Radio stations established in 2014
2014 establishments in Oklahoma
Radio stations disestablished in 2018
2018 disestablishments in Oklahoma
ONZ